This is a list of the 168 present and extant barons in the peerage of the Kingdom of Spain.

Barons in the peerage of Spain

See also
Spanish nobility
List of dukes in the peerage of Spain
List of viscounts in the peerage of Spain
List of lords in the peerage of Spain

Bibliography

External links
Consejo de la Grandeza de España: Title guide

  
Baronies
Baronies
Spanish noble titles
Spain